Ericel Gómez Nucamendi (born 31 January 1948) is a Mexican politician affiliated with the Convergence. As of 2014 he served as Senator of the LXI Legislature of the Mexican Congress representing Oaxaca as replacement of Gabino Cué Monteagudo. He also served as Deputy during the L Legislature

References

1948 births
Living people
Politicians from Chiapas
Members of the Senate of the Republic (Mexico)
Members of the Chamber of Deputies (Mexico)
Citizens' Movement (Mexico) politicians
20th-century Mexican politicians
21st-century Mexican politicians
Benito Juárez Autonomous University of Oaxaca alumni